Club de Fútbol Calamocha is a Spanish football team based in Calamocha, in the autonomous community of Aragon. Founded in 1940, it plays in Tercera División, Group 17, holding home games at Jumaya.

History

The club was founded in 1940, and has mostly played in the regional categories of Aragon, prominently in the Primera Regional and in recent times the Regional Preferente.

In the 2017–18 season, for the first time in CF Calamocha's history, the club won promotion to the Tercera División of Spanish football after finishing second in the Regional Preferente and competed in the Tercera División, Group 17.

Season to season

3 seasons in Tercera División
46 seasons in Categorías Regionales

Current squad

Current staff

Reserve team
In 2017 the CF Calamocha B was founded, which play their matches in the Segunda Regional of Aragón.

Stadium

CF Calamocha plays its matches in Jumaya, with natural grass.

Honours

 Categorías Regionales (2): 1986–87, 2008–09
 Runners-Up (4): 1984–85, 1985–86, 2004–05, 2017–18

References

Sources

External links
  
 Season History at FRE 

Football clubs in Aragon
Association football clubs established in 1940
1940 establishments in Spain